This is a list of purpose-built capitals of country subdivisions.

List

See also 
 Lists of capitals

References